Chitrangada: The Crowning Wish is a 2012 Bengali-language film written and directed by Rituparno Ghosh. The film premiered on 25 May 2012 at the New York Indian Film Festival. The film tells the story of a choreographer who is struggling with his gender identity. It is loosely based on Rabindranath Tagore's play Chitra; which is Tagore's take on the story of Chitrāngadā, a character from the Mahābhārata.

Plot
Rudra Chatterjee (Rituparno Ghosh) has spent his life 
going against social convention. As a young man he defied his father's wishes, and became a choreographer instead of an engineer. As he prepares with his team to stage Tagore's Chitrangada, he meets Partho (Jisshu Sengupta) who is a drug-addict percussionist introduced to the team by the main dancer Kasturi (Raima Sen). Soon, Rudra develops a chemistry with Partho and they are deep into a passionate love affair. During the course of their relationship, they decide to adopt a child. But there is one problem: same-sex couples are not permitted to adopt children. So Rudra decides to go through a gender change treatment to embrace the womanhood he longs for. But will this surgery change his life and fulfill all his long-cherished dreams? The story ends with the line "Be What You Wish To Be".

Cast
Rituparno Ghosh as Rudra "Khokon" Chatterjee
Jisshu Sengupta as Partho, the percussionist
Anjan Dutt as Subho
Anashua Majumdar as Rudra's mother
Deepankar De as Rudra's father
Raima Sen as Kasturi in a guest appearance
Aparajita Auddy as Mala in a guest appearance
Kaushik Banerjee as Manish
Sanjoy Nag (cameo appearance) as Rahul (Rudra's ex-boyfriend)

Awards
Special Jury Award at the 60th National Film Awards

References

External links
 

2012 films
Indian drama films
Films based on the Mahabharata
Indian LGBT-related films
Films directed by Rituparno Ghosh
Bengali-language Indian films
2010s Bengali-language films
Transgender-related films
2012 LGBT-related films
2012 drama films